Derrick Jackson (born 11 January 1966) is an American politician who has been a member of the Georgia House of Representatives since 2017. He represents District 64.

He was elected in the 2016 Georgia House of Representatives election, and is a candidate for the 2022 Georgia lieutenant gubernatorial election.

References 

1966 births
Living people
21st-century American politicians
Democratic Party members of the Georgia House of Representatives
African-American state legislators in Georgia (U.S. state)
21st-century African-American politicians
20th-century African-American people